Andrew Louw (born August 18, 1987) is a Namibian cricket umpire and former player.

As a right-handed batsman and a right-arm off-break bowler, he represented the Namibian under-19 side at the 2006 Under-19 World Cup, and subsequently played a single first-class match for the senior Namibian national team, against KwaZulu-Natal Inland in 2009. After qualifying as an umpire, Louw made his first-class umpiring debut in April 2013, and has since officiated in limited-overs and Twenty20 matches.

His father, Wynand Louw, is also an umpire, and has sat on the ICC Associates and Affiliates Umpire Panel since 2013. The pair officiated a 12-a-side game between Namibia A and Kenya in November 2014, and also stood together in a 20-over match between Namibia and Hong Kong in May 2015, which had full Twenty20 status.

On 20 May 2019, he stood in his first Twenty20 International (T20I) match, between Kenya and Nigeria in Regional Finals of the 2018–19 ICC T20 World Cup Africa Qualifier tournament in Uganda.

See also
 List of One Day International cricket umpires
 List of Twenty20 International cricket umpires

References

External links
Andrew Louw at ESPN Cricinfo
Andrew Louw at Cricket Archive

1987 births
Namibian cricketers
Living people
Namibian cricket umpires
Namibian One Day International cricket umpires
Namibian Twenty20 International cricket umpires
Cricketers from Windhoek